Edwin Godee (born 26 September 1964) is a Dutch retired professional footballer who played for Ajax, FC Utrecht, Willem II, De Graafschap and Heracles Almelo. He was a member of the Dutch squad at the 1983 FIFA World Youth Championship. His son is current player Joey Godee.

Honours
FC Utrecht
 KNVB Cup: 1984–85

References

External links
 
 Player profile at Voetbal International 
 Cv Edwin Godee 

1964 births
Living people
Footballers from Utrecht (city)
Association football midfielders
Dutch footballers
Netherlands youth international footballers
AFC Ajax players
FC Utrecht players
Willem II (football club) players
De Graafschap players
Eredivisie players
Eerste Divisie players